SafeInCloud is a proprietary password manager to securely store passwords and other credentials offline and in the cloud. It is similar to Enpass which has the same functionality.

Features
 One master password
 Everything is encrypted locally
 Cloud synchronization to Google Drive, Dropbox, OneDrive and WebDAV
 Cross browser and platform support
 Strong password generation
 Password encryption
 AutoFill Passwords with the help of browser extensions
 Portable access

See also
 Comparison of password managers

References

External links
 

Software that uses Qt
Password managers
Cross-platform software
IOS software
Android (operating system) software
Universal Windows Platform apps
MacOS software